Modern Music from San Francisco is a studio album featuring the Vince Guaraldi Quartet, the Ron Crotty Trio and the Jerry Dodgion Quartet recorded in August 1955 and released on Fantasy Records in May 1956. The record is the first album to feature pianist and future Peanuts composer Vince Guaraldi leading his own quartet rather than augmenting other established groups.

Modern Music from San Francisco was issued on CD in 2001 by Fantasy under the name The Jazz Scene: San Francisco, adding several tracks by the Charlie Mariano Sextet.

Critical reception
AllMusic critic Scott Yanow noted, "five originals and two standards are performed in fine cool jazz fashion. The music is not essential but is enjoyable and somewhat historical." Derrick Bang, historian and author of Vince Guaraldi at the Piano, cited the track "Ginza" as of great "significance," noting that it became "one of Guaraldi's first anthems: a 'personal standard' that quickly earned a spot in his ongoing repertoire." Bang added that it is "a sassy, fast-paced romp with echoes of Fats Waller's 'Jitterbug Waltz'." Bang also highlighted "Calling Dr. Funk", as "a loose, smoky, mildly dirty blues number that sounds like a theme song: probably not accidental, because the title referenced the nickname—Dr. Funk—by which Guaraldi already was coming to be known."

Track listing

Personnel 
Vince Guaraldi Quartet
Vince Guaraldi – piano, celesta
Eugene Wright – bass
 – drums
Jerry Dodgion – alto saxophone

Ron Crotty Trio
Ron Crotty – bass
Eddie Duran – guitar
Vince Guaraldi – piano, celesta

Jerry Dodgion Quartet
Jerry Dodgion – alto saxophone
Sonny Clark – piano
Eugene Wright – bass
Lawrence Marable – drums

Additional
Ralph J. Gleason – liner notes

Release history

References

External links 
 

1956 live albums
Collaborative albums
Fantasy Records albums
Vince Guaraldi albums
Vince Guaraldi live albums